The 2nd Pan Arab Games were held in Beirut, Lebanon between October 12 and October 28, 1957. 914 athletes from 10 countries participated in events in 12 sports.

Sports

Medals won by country

References

External links
Football tournament details

 
P
Pan Arab Games
Pan Arab Games
Pan Arab Games
Pan Arab Games
Multi-sport events in Lebanon
20th century in Beirut
October 1957 sports events in Asia